William Hampshire (c. 1525 – 1558 or later) was the member of Parliament for Cricklade in the parliament of April 1554, Wootton Bassett in November 1554, and Cricklade in 1558.

References 

Members of the Parliament of England (pre-1707) for Cricklade
English MPs 1554
Year of birth uncertain
1558 deaths
1525 births
Members of the Parliament of England (pre-1707) for Wootton Bassett
English MPs 1554–1555
English MPs 1558